Paolo Tosato (born 8 September 1972) is an Italian politician. He has been Senator in the Italian Senate since 2014.

In 2016 Tosato presented a resolution against sanctions imposed on Russia. He was listed as a recipient of thousands of euros for passing the resolution in leaked emails of Russia's International Agency for Current Policy.    He strongly refuted the accusation. Similar resolutions, have previously been presented in other circumstances by other politicians as in the Regional Council of Veneto.

References 

Living people
1972 births
20th-century Italian politicians
21st-century Italian politicians
Senators of Legislature XVII of Italy
Senators of Legislature XVIII of Italy
Lega Nord politicians
Members of the Regional Council of Veneto